Live from the Battle in Seattle is the only album released by anti-globalization punk band The No WTO Combo. Of the five tracks on the album, only two, "New Feudalism" and "Electronic Plantation", are original songs. "Let's Lynch the Landlord" and "Full Metal Jackoff" are both covers, by Jello Biafra's former band Dead Kennedys, and D.O.A. featuring Biafra, respectively. "Battle in Seattle" is an opening speech/rallying cry by Jello Biafra. Biafra later re-recorded "New Feudalism" and "Electronic Plantation" for the album The Audacity of Hype by Jello Biafra and the Guantanamo School of Medicine.

Track listing
"Battle in Seattle" – 15:02
"Let's Lynch the Landlord" – 3:41
"New Feudalism" – 4:15
"Electronic Plantation" – 4:55
"Full Metal Jackoff" – 16:28

Personnel
Jello Biafra – vocals
Kim Thayil – guitar
Krist Novoselic – bass
Gina Mainwal – drums
The No WTO Combo – Main Performer
Shepard Fairey – CD Art Adaptation, Tray Photo, Cover Art Concept
Tony Gale – Photography
Jason Rosenberg – Construction
Jack Endino – Mixing
Jello Biafra – Package Concept
Necessity – Producer
Mark Cavener – Engineer / Producer
Todd Robbins – Digital Editing

The No WTO Combo albums
1999 debut albums
1999 live albums
Alternative Tentacles live albums
Albums with cover art by Shepard Fairey